Bram is a given name for a male. It is derived from the name Abraham, and common in Dutch-speaking regions. It can also be a short form of Abraham, Abram or Bertram.

People
Notable people named Bram to include:

 Abraham Bram van de Beek (born 1946), Dutch theologian
 Bram Bogart (1921–2012), Dutch-born Belgian painter
 Bram Cohen (born 1975), American computer programmer
 Bram De Ly (born 1984), Dutch retired footballer
 Abram Bram Fischer (1908–1975), South African anti-apartheid lawyer
 Bram Gay (1930–2019), British trumpet player
 Bram Moolenaar (born 1961), Dutch computer programmer
 Bram Morrison (born 1940), Canadian musician
 Abraham Bram Moszkowicz (born 1960), Dutch disbarred lawyer
 Bram Nuytinck (born 1990), Dutch footballer
 Abraham Bram van Ojik (born 1954), Dutch politician
 Abraham Bram Peper (born 1940), Dutch sociologist and former politician
 Bram van der Stok (1915–1993), Dutch aviator
 Abraham "Bram" Stoker (1847–1912), Irish author who wrote Dracula (1897)
 Bram Vandenbussche (born 1981), Belgian footballer
 Abraham Bram van Velde (1895–1981), Dutch painter
 Bram van der Vlugt (1934-2020), Dutch actor

Fictional characters
 Bram Bowman, a main character in the American TV series Colony
 Bram Howard, a character in seasons 6 and 7 of The West Wing
 Bram Greenfield, a main character in Becky Albertalli’s young adult book Simon vs. the Homo Sapiens Agenda, movie Love, Simon, and a minor character in the spin-off Hulu series Love, Victor

Dutch masculine given names
Hypocorisms
English masculine given names